Saaremaa virus is a single-stranded, negative-sense, RNA virus Orthohantavirus that causes a milder form of Hantavirus hemorrhagic fever with renal syndrome. It is a member virus of Dobrava-Belgrade orthohantavirus.  It was first isolated from a striped field mouse in Slovakia.

References

External links
 Sloan Science and Film / Short Films / Muerto Canyon by Jen Peel 29 minutes
 "Hantaviruses, with emphasis on Four Corners Hantavirus" by Brian Hjelle, M.D., Department of Pathology, School of Medicine, University of New Mexico
 CDC's Hantavirus Technical Information Index page
 Viralzone: Hantavirus
 Virus Pathogen Database and Analysis Resource (ViPR): Bunyaviridae
 Occurrences and deaths in North and South America

Viral diseases
Hantaviridae
Hemorrhagic fevers
Rodent-carried diseases